TRS may refer to:

Organizations
 Telangana Rashtra Samithi, a political party in Telangana, India
 ThalesRaytheonSystems, French-American aerospace and defense electronics company
 The Right Stuff, a right-wing podcasting site and blog
 Turtle Rock Studios, a video game developer
 TRS (motorcycle), motorcycle producer

Transportation
 TRS, IATA code for Friuli Venezia Giulia Airport, near Trieste, Italy
 TRS, ICAO code for AirTran Airways, in Orlando, Florida, US

Finance and economics
 Taxable REIT subsidiaries, real estate investment trusts
 Teachers' Retirement System of the State of Illinois
 Teacher Retirement System of Texas
 Total return swap
 Total revenue share
 Technical rate of substitution, marginal rate of technical substitution in economics

Technology
 Telecommunications relay service, telephone service for the deaf
 Ticketing and Reservation System, China Railways
 Tip-Ring-Sleeve, a phone connector type
 Timing Reference Signal in serial digital interface for video
 Term rewriting system in mathematics
 TRS-80, a Tandy Radio Shack personal computer
 Transmission Raman spectroscopy

Other uses
 Trainz Railroad Simulator, a series of computer games
 Toyota Racing Series, a racing series based in New Zealand